The Vision and the Scarlet Witch is a series of comic books published by Marvel Comics. The primary characters of these comics star the Vision and Scarlet Witch, known as a couple and are two longtime members of the Avengers.

Publication history

Volume 1
Their first key series together was published in the beginning of November 1982 which contained four issues. The limited series was written by Bill Mantlo and pencilled by Rick Leonardi. In this series, the villain Magneto is retconned as the father of Scarlet Witch and Quicksilver while intending to give up his villainous ways of life. The reveal had some previous clues which were released during Avengers and X-Men titles. This stayed as comic book canon for many decades until it was undone in the 2014 crossover storyline AXIS.

Volume 2
The second series which lasted twelve issues was published in 1985 and was written by Steve Englehart. In this series, Scarlet Witch becomes pregnant magically and delivers two sons. Englehart tried to keep the series self-contained and made the characters resign from the Avengers. He also omitted the theme of racism towards mutants, considering that it was already dealt with in the X-Men titles. The series was focused on family drama rather than superhero exploits. Magic was also a common topic but was toned down in comparison with Englehart's run on Doctor Strange. Englehart lamented that Scarlet Witch's motherhood did not stick, as the children were killed shortly after he ended writing the character.

Collected editions
 Avengers: Vision and the Scarlet Witch collects Giant-Size Avengers #4 and The Vision and the Scarlet Witch #1–4, 128 pages, May 2015, 
 Avengers: Vision & The Scarlet Witch - A Year in the Life collects The Vision and the Scarlet Witch vol. 2 #1–12, 344 pages, June 2010, 
 Vision & The Scarlet Witch: The Saga Of Wanda And Vision collects Giant-Size Avengers #4, The Vision and the Scarlet Witch (1982) #1-4, The Vision and the Scarlet Witch (1985) #1-12 and West Coast Avengers (1985) #2, 472 pages, January 2021,

See also
 WandaVision – an American television miniseries based on the Marvel Comics characters Scarlet Witch and Vision.

References

External links
 
 
 The Vision and the Scarlet Witch at the Unofficial Handbook of Marvel Comics Creators

1982 comics debuts
1985 comics debuts
1983 comics endings
Avengers (comics) titles
Comics by Steve Englehart
Defunct American comics
Marvel Comics limited series
Scarlet Witch